Mali Žam is a village in Serbia. It is situated in the Vršac municipality, in the South Banat District, Vojvodina province.

Name

The name in Serbian means "Small Žam/Jam". Across the border into Romania, the first village is called Jamu Mare (Great Jam/Žam).

Ethnic groups (2011 census)
The village has a Romanian ethnic majority and its population numbers 279 individuals (2011 census).

 Romanians = 229 (60.42%)
 Serbs = 108 (28.50)
 others.

Historical population

1961: 880
1971: 698
1981: 565
1991: 499
2002: 379
2011: 275

References

Slobodan Ćurčić, Broj stanovnika Vojvodine, Novi Sad, 1996.

See also
List of places in Serbia
List of cities, towns and villages in Vojvodina

Populated places in Serbian Banat
Populated places in South Banat District
Vršac
Romania–Serbia border crossings
Romanian communities in Serbia